ISO 3166-2:SC is the entry for Seychelles in ISO 3166-2, part of the ISO 3166 standard published by the International Organization for Standardization (ISO), which defines codes for the names of the principal subdivisions (e.g., provinces or states) of all countries coded in ISO 3166-1.

Currently for Seychelles, ISO 3166-2 codes are defined for 27 districts. The Outer Islands, which are not part of any district, are not listed.

Each code consists of two parts, separated by a hyphen. The second part is two digits:
 01–23: districts created in 1979
 24–25: districts created in 1998
 26–27: districts created in 2020

The codes for each group of districts are assigned in French alphabetical order, except Au Cap, whose code is assigned based on its former name, Anse Louis.

Current codes
Subdivision names are listed as in the ISO 3166-2 standard published by the ISO 3166 Maintenance Agency (ISO 3166/MA).

ISO 639-1 codes are used to represent subdivision names in the following administrative languages:
 (en): English
 (fr): French
 (—): Seselwa (Seychellois Creole)

Click on the button in the header to sort each column.

Changes
The following changes to the entry have been announced in newsletters by the ISO 3166/MA since the first publication of ISO 3166-2 in 1998. ISO stopped issuing newsletters in 2013.

The following changes to the entry are listed on ISO's online catalogue, the Online Browsing Platform:

See also
 Subdivisions of Seychelles
 FIPS region codes of Seychelles

External links
 ISO Online Browsing Platform: SC
 Districts of Seychelles, Statoids.com

2:SC
ISO 3166-2
Seychelles geography-related lists